10 of the World's best engines  is an annual list of the ten "best" automobile engines available in the U.S. market, that are selected by Ward's AutoWorld magazine. The list was started in 1994 for Model Year 1995, and has been drawn every year since then, published at the end of the preceding year.

Engines must be available in regular-production vehicles on sale in the U.S. market no later than the first quarter of the year. During a 2-month testing period, Wards editors evaluate each engine according to a number of objective and subjective criteria in everyday driving situations – there is no instrumented testing. The selection takes into account power and torque output, noise, vibration and harshness (NVH) levels, technical relevance, and basic comparative numbers. Each engine competes against all others.

For the 2020 competition, the name will be changed to Worlds 10 Best Engines and Propulsion Systems.

Results

Rankings
Number of times the following makes have received the award (excluding the special 20th century awards):

See also
 List of motor vehicle awards
International Engine of the Year
PACE Award
World Car of the Year

References

External links
Wards AutoWorld official website

Motor vehicle awards
Automobile engines
Lists of automobile engines